Aneek, established on 09 October  1999, is a group theatre based in Kolkata, India. Aneek celebrates its Silver Jubilee this year.

Background
Aneek organises theatre festivals. From 1999 it has organised the international theatre festival Ganga Jamuna Natya Utsab which involves theatre groups from West Bengal, rest of India and other countries like Japan, Nepal, America and Germany. It also has organised an Inter-school and Inter-College drama Competition since 2003. From 2010, Aneek has organised the Bengali Short Drama Festival. A National Symposium,  The Subaltern in Indian Theatre was organised on 13 and 14 November 2010 in collaboration with Department of English, University of Calcutta. In 2011, a festival was organised to commemorate the 150th birth anniversary of Rabindranath Tagore. Twenty five groups from all the 19 districts of West Bengal participated.

In 2012, a 2-day Symposium titled Rural problems & Indian Theatre was organised. The 14th Ganga Jamuna Natya utsab was held from 24 December 2011 to 4 January 2012 in Kolkata & Madhyamgram. Thirty two teams participated in the festival. The 15th Ganga Jamuna Natya Utsab was held from 23 December 2012 to 4 January 2013 in Kolkata & Madhyamgram. A National Symposium, 'Society, Nation & Rabindranath' was organised by Aneek aided by Ministry Of Culture, Government of India on 23 and 24 June 2012 at Bharatiya Bhasha Parishad Auditorium, Kolkata. Eminent speakers from all over the country gave deliberations.

In September 2013, a six-day theatre festival "Ganga-Jamuna Natyautsab" was arranged by Ganga-Jamuna Natyautsab Parishad (Bangladesh Committee), in association with Aneek. The festival showcased a total of 17 plays from Bangladesh and one from India. Aneek staged "Prateek," at 7pm at the National Theatre Hall of BSA on the closing day. Leading troupes of Bangladesh like Aranyak, Dhaka Theatre, Loko Natya Dal, Prachyanat, Nagarik Natyangan and others staged their acclaimed plays in the event.

The 16th Ganga Jamuna Natya Utsab will be held from 22 December 2013 to 3 January 2014.

Production of plays
 Haldi Nadeer Teeray
 Kremliner Ghari
 Ekjan Pratarak
 Lal Ghase Neel Ghora
 Sukh Chai Sukh
 Purna Apurna
 Samayer Abartey
 Adrisya Asukh
 Samparka
 Dwitiyo Basanta
 Punorujjiban
 Adventure Kare Kay
 Tapati
 Ekusher Golpo
 Prateek
 Chi-kissa
 Ashokananda
Shakuntala

Short plays
 Halla Aschhe Bhago
 Samikkha
 Jallad
 Aap Ki Adalat
 Bangla Bnachao
 Feedgool
 Bikalpa (Audio Drama)
 Punorujjiban (Audio Drama)

Special productions
Panta Akali
 Louha Manab
 Sarisrip
 Dalia

Awards
Lebedev Award (USSR): Best Production, Best Dramatist, Best Director 
Nurun Nahar Samad Natya Padak (Bangladesh): Best Production, Best Dramatist, Best Director 
West Bengal State Natya Academy Award-Amalesh Chakraborty (Script), Malay Biswas (Direction), Ajay Duttagupta (Stage design), Sunil Chatterjee (Actor), Tapati Bhattacherji (Actress)

References

External links
 "Homepage","Aneek Theatre Group"
 "Time out", "The Telegraph", 10 February 2011.
 "Subaltern Theatre losing revolutionary zeal", "The Hindu", 14 November 2010.
 "Indian theatre troupe wows audience on day 7"    "Daily Sun"
 "'Ganga-Jamuna Natyautsab’ begins on a high note" "Daily Sun"
 "‘Ganga-Jamuna Natyautsab’ ends today" "The New Nation BD"
 "Ganga-Jamuna Natyautsab: ‘Apod’ staged on day 5" "Daily Sun"
 Articles on the inauguration of 'Ganga-Jamuna Natyautsab "BD-Pratidin" and "Kaler Kontho"
 Article on 'Amar Desh' describing the cultural relevance of Ganga-Jamuna Natyautsab  "আমার েদশ"
 

Theatre companies in India
Organisations based in Kolkata
Bengali theatre groups
Companies based in Kolkata
1988 establishments in West Bengal
Arts organizations established in 1988